Kangarestan may refer to:
 Kangarestan, Khuzestan